The Newcastle Gold Cup is a Newcastle Jockey Club  Group 3 Australian Thoroughbred open handicap horse race over a distance of 2300 metres, held at Broadmeadow Racecourse in Newcastle, New South Wales, Australia in September. Total prize money for the race is A$250,000.

History

1947 racebook

Grade
 1898–1980 - Principal Race
 1981–1984 - Group 3 
 1985–2001 - Group 2 
 2001 onwards -  Group 3

Distance

 1898–1906 - 1 miles
 1907 - 1 miles
 1908–1935 - 1 miles
 1936 - 1 miles
 1937 - 1 miles
 1938 - 1 miles
 1939–1943 - 1 miles
 1944 - 1 miles
 1945–1971 - 1 miles
 1972–1977 – 2250 metres
 1978 – 2300 metres
 1979–1980 – 2250 metres
 1981–1991 – 2300 metres
 1992–2000 – 2400 metres
 2001–2015 - 2300 metres
 2016 - 2200 metres
 2017 onwards - 2300 metres

Winners

 2022 - Durston
 2021 - Great House
 2020 - Mugatoo
 2019 - Hush Writer
 2018 - Carzoff
 2017 - Broadside
 2016 - Sacred Master
 2015 – Beyond Thankful
 2014 – Disclaimer
 2013 – Winning Glory
 2012 – Glencadam Gold
 2011 – Green Moon
 2010 – Stratofortress
 2009 – Streetfighter
 2008 – Bianca
 2007 – race not held
 2006 – Bikkie Tin Blues
 2005 – Carael Boy/High Cee
 2004 – Another Warrior
 2003 – Comforts
 2002 – Time Off
 2001 – Agincourt Express
 2000 – Silent Impact
 1999 – Maltese Beauty
 1998 – Joss Sticks
 1997 – Emerald Cut
 1996 – My Kiwi Gold
 1995 – Seto Bridge
 1994 – Oompala
 1993 – Azzaam
 1992 – Beachside
 1991 – Maharajah
 1990 – Our Magic Man
 1989 – Hunter
 1988 – Eye Of The Sky
 1987 – The Brotherhood
 1986 – Indian Raj
 1985 – Mr. Mako
 1984 – Forward Charge
 1983 – Chiamare
 1982 – Gurner's Lane
 1981 – No Peer
 1980 – Star Dynasty
 1979 – Iko
 1978 – Over The Ocean
 1977 – Hyperno
 1976 – Mansingh
 1975 – Pyramul
 1974 – St. Martin
 1973 – Daneson
 1972 – Glimpse-O-Gold
 1971 – Chancellor
 1970 – Abbe D'Or
 1969 – Maigret
 1968 – Broadway Boy
 1967 – Aveniam
 1966 – Duo
 1965 – Duo
 1964 – Brunswick
 1963 – Royal Rake
 1962 – Tamure
 1961 – Rock Mal
 1960 – North Row
 1959 – Foxmara
 1958 – Flash Gem
 1957 – Gallant Lee
 1956 – Dewaroy
 1955 – Triatic
 1954 – Sir Pilot
 1953 – Gallant Archer
 1952 – Benvolo
 1951 – Ben Hero
 1950 – Conductor
 1949 – Wearie
 1948 – Black Pearl
 1947 – Buonarroti Boy
 1946 – Bon Terre
 1945 – Turn Again
 1944 – Russia
 1943 – Precise
 1942 – Goose Boy
 1941 – Lord Valentine
 1940 – Buzalong
 1939 – Salazar
 1938 – King Gee
 1937 – Mestoravon
 1936 – Tapestry
 1935 – Milantheon
 1934 – Broccoli
 1933 – Sassanides
 1932 – Circus Star
 1931 – Strength
 1930 – Vertoy
 1929 – Honan
 1928 – Dion
 1927 – Horton Gag
 1926 – Donald
 1925 – Kiga
 1924 – Hosier
 1923 – Pennybont
 1922 – Lord Zell
 1921 – Sandbee
 1920 – Red Cardinal
 1919 – Mount Alf
 1918 – Silent Way
 1917 – Norbury
 1916 – Duke Alwyne
 1915 – Duke Alwyne
 1914 – Sir Alwynton
 1913 – Sir Vive
 1912 – Psyttyx
 1911 – Strathroyal
 1910 – Lady Wilde
 1909 – Rocklight
 1908 – Goldlock
 1907 – Anatroff
 1906 – Gladsome
 1905 – Zythos
 1904 – Strabo
 1903 – Oblivion
 1902 – Burraneer
 1901 – Salute
 1900 – America
 1899 – The Prize
 1898 – Raven's Plume

See also
 List of Australian Group races
 Group races

References

Horse races in Australia
Sport in Newcastle, New South Wales